Blaž Medvešek (born July 10, 1980 in Maribor) is a former backstroke swimmer from Slovenia, who competed for his native country of Slovenia at the 2004 Summer Olympics in Athens, Greece as well as at 2000 Summer Olympics in Sydney, Australia. In his swimming career, he has represented Branik, Maribor and Ilirija, Ljubljana Swimming Clubs and achieved highest achievements while training in Ljubljana with coach Dimitrij Mancevič and team mate Peter Mankoč.

Blaž is still considered to be one of the most successful Slovenian swimmers of all time being finalist at all major swimming competitions including the 2004 Summer Olympics and winning numerous national titles. Furthermore, he still holds the national records in long course pools in 50 m backstroke (26.08), 100 m backstroke (54.88), and 200 m backstroke (1:58.61) as well as for short course meters pools in 100 m backstroke (52.69) and 200 m backstroke (1:52.39).

The highest achievements include (chronologically):
 1997: European Junior Championships - 8th 100 m backstroke
 1998: European Junior Championships - 5th 200 m backstroke, 7th 100 m backstroke
 2000: 2004 Summer Olympics - 23rd 200 m backstroke, 32nd 100 m backstroke;European LC Championships 2000 - 9th 200 m backstroke, 12th 50 m backstroke; European SC Championships 2000 - 3rd 200 m backstroke, 4th 100 m backstroke, 6th 50 m backstroke; 2000 FINA Short Course World Championships - 11th 100 m backstroke
 2001: 2001 World Aquatics Championships - 14th 100 m backstroke; European SC Championships 2001 - 6th 200 m backstroke, 6th 100 m backstroke, 11th 50 m backstroke; Mediterranean Games - 2nd 100 m backstroke
 2002: European LC Championships 2002 - 8th 200 m backstroke, 13th 100 m backstroke, 13th 50 m backstroke; 2002 FINA Short Course World Championships - 3rd 200 m backstroke, 13th 50 m backstroke; European SC Championships 2000 - 9th 200 m backstroke, 14th 100 m backstroke
 2003: 2003 World Aquatics Championships - 8th 200 m backstroke, 10th 100 m backstroke, 10th 4×100 m medley relay; European SC Championships 2003 - 1st 200 m backstroke, 13th 100 m backstroke
 2004: 2004 Summer Olympics - 8th 200 m backstroke, 14th 4×100 m medley relay; European LC Championships 2004 - 4th 100 m backstroke, 4th 200 m backstroke; European SC Championships 2004 - 2nd 200 m backstroke, 4th 100 m backstroke
 2005: 2005 World Aquatics Championships - 8th 100 m backstroke, 10th 200 m backstroke, final 4×100 medley relay (dq), 10th 4×100 m freestyle; Mediterranean Games - 1st 200 m backstroke, 1st 4×100 m medley relay; European SC Championships 2005 - 8th 200 m freestyle, 16th 100 m freestyle
 2006: 2006 European Championships in Aquatics - 8th 200 m freestyle, 13th 400 m freestyle, 15th 100 m freestyle

Medvešek decided to retire in 2006 to focus on other aspects of his life and is currently finishing a degree in economics at the University of Maribor in Maribor, Slovenia.

References
Slovenian Swimming Federation

1980 births
Living people
Slovenian male swimmers
Olympic swimmers of Slovenia
Male backstroke swimmers
Swimmers at the 2004 Summer Olympics
Swimmers at the 2000 Summer Olympics
Sportspeople from Maribor
University of Maribor alumni
Medalists at the FINA World Swimming Championships (25 m)
Mediterranean Games gold medalists for Slovenia
Swimmers at the 2005 Mediterranean Games
Universiade medalists in swimming
Mediterranean Games medalists in swimming
Universiade gold medalists for Slovenia
Medalists at the 2005 Summer Universiade